Víctor Manuel Baute Montanez (born March 23, 1972) is a former boxer from Spain, who competed at the 1992 Summer Olympics in Barcelona.

External links
  Spanish Olympic Committee
 

1972 births
Living people
Welterweight boxers
Boxers at the 1992 Summer Olympics
Olympic boxers of Spain
Place of birth missing (living people)
Spanish male boxers
20th-century Spanish people